Mrinmoy Bhowmick is an Indian documentary filmmaker best known for critically acclaimed documentary film I Can Love Too (2011).

Background
Mrinmoy Bhowmick is a qualified journalist and documentary director-producer based in India.

He has a deep rooted interest in highlighting the issues and challenges of People with Disability (PWD) and his past work on the lines are a testimony to the fact. Most of his earlier films have dealt with social issues related to Disability and Child rights.

Films

I Can Love Too (2011)

The documentary film deals with the issues and concerns of "specially-abled persons", their need and desire for love, and finding a right life partner. In addition to that, the film presents their opinions and expectations of a husband/wife, and optimism of being happily married all their life. The film has earned multiple awards and nominations.

The film was listed among  "10 must-watch Indian documentaries with very strong and impactful stories".

SiliconIndia magazine listed the film in "10 Inspirational documentaries on India you can't miss". Indiatimes included the film in the list of "Inspirational Documentaries".

The film was also cited as  "8 Indian documentaries you cannot afford to miss".

Unsighted Hopes (2010)

The documentary film explores the causes behind the negligence of proper educational environment for visually challenged children in Chamarajanagar, a district and town in the southern end Karnataka, a state in India. The film also documents the reasons behind the absence of a special school, and trained teachers under Sarva Shikhsha Abhiyan for visually impaired children in the entire district.

Other films

 Untouched Unexplored (2010)
 The Life At Other Side (2009)

See also
 List of Indian documentary filmmakers

References

External links
 

Indian documentary filmmakers
Film directors from Bangalore
Indian documentary film editors
Living people
21st-century Indian film directors
Film editors from Karnataka
Year of birth missing (living people)